Linda Moons (born 14 May 1965) is a Dutch volleyball player. She competed in the women's tournament at the 1992 Summer Olympics.

References

External links
 

1965 births
Living people
Dutch women's volleyball players
Olympic volleyball players of the Netherlands
Volleyball players at the 1992 Summer Olympics
People from Breukelen
Sportspeople from Utrecht (province)